Zhary is a rural locality (a village) in Malyshevskoye Rural Settlement, Selivanovsky District, Vladimir Oblast, Russia. The population was 22 as of 2010.

Geography 
Zhary is located on the Ushna River, 21 km southwest of Krasnaya Gorbatka (the district's administrative centre) by road. Krasnaya Ushna is the nearest rural locality.

References 

Rural localities in Selivanovsky District